A lei is a large bronze wine jar used from the late Shang dynasty period to the Eastern Zhou dynasty period in ancient China, with a characteristic double-eared and narrow-necked shape. They come in square and round varieties, with the former used by the Shang, and the latter used by both the Shang and Zhou. Over time, the form of the lei gradually transitioned from thin, tall vessels to shorter jars. Within the Erligang culture, lei vessels were cast in the Central Plains and exported to the middle reaches of the Yangtze River.

References

Chinese bronzeware